General elections were held in Guatemala on 20 October 1957. Miguel Ortiz Passarelli won the presidential election. However, the elections were nullified on 23 October 1957 following protests against electoral fraud.

Results

President

References

Bibliography
Villagrán Kramer, Francisco. Biografía política de Guatemala: años de guerra y años de paz. FLACSO-Guatemala, 2004. 
Political handbook of the world 1957. New York, 1958.

Elections in Guatemala
Guatemala
1957 in Guatemala
Presidential elections in Guatemala
Annulled elections
Election and referendum articles with incomplete results